The La Toca Formation is a geologic formation in the northern and eastern part of the Dominican Republic. The formation, predominantly an alternating sequence of marls and turbiditic sandstones, breccias and conglomerates, is renowned for the preservation of insects and other arthropods in amber, known as Dominican amber. The formation is dated to the Burdigalian to Langhian stages of the Miocene period (Hemingfordian in the NALMA classification).

Description 

La Toca Formation was first defined by Redmond in 1982. The formation mainly consists of marls and turbiditic sandstones and conglomerates deposited in the northeastern part of Hispaniola. The formation overlies the Los Hidalgos Formation and is overlain by the La Jaiba Conglomerate and in places by the Villa Trina Formation. It is laterally and time-equivalent with the Altamira and Luperón Formations and the Agua Clara Unit.

Esperanza
In the vicinity of Esperanza, La Toca Formation is cropping out in the northeast of the geologic map, while it is also present in the neighboring municipalities of Imbert and San Francisco Arriba. The formation in this area comprises rhythmic alternations of ochre fine-to-medium-grained, locally grading to course-grained sandstones and greyish clayey and ochre marls. This succession is locally cut by meters thick microconglomerates and conglomerates with rounded and subrounded clasts. Analysis of the clasts in San Francisco Arriba shows the clasts consist of up to ten percent of volcanic rock fragments, mainly limestone fragments (23-42%), quartz (8-33%), chert of up to five percent and minor metamorphic rock fragments. The matrix which comprises about a quarter of the volume is micritic.

The formation is in this area poor in microfossils, although foraminifera of Catapsydrax af. dissimilis, Globigerinoides trilobus, Globigerina sp., Globorotalia sp., Cibicides sp., Brizalina sp., Reophax sp., ?Cassidulina sp. and Pirgo sp. have been found in the succession.

Turbidite deposition moved to the northeast during the Miocene.

Tectonics and depositional environment 

La Toca Formation is in places inverted and put in contact with the San Marcos Formation along the Camú Fault. The Septentrional Fault bounds the formation to the south.

Individual outcrops 
The formation crops out in the provinces Puerto Plata and Hermanas Mirabal.

Puerto Plata
In Puerto Plata Province, two sections of La Toca Formation are visible. The type section along the Bajabonico River shows volcaniclastic breccias with clasts originating from the Pedro García Formation. The breccias are poorly stratified and contain angular clasts of vesicular basalts and andesites, polymictic conglomerates of various provenance and chlorite-rich feldspathic arenites. This sequence is overlain by bluish-grey marls and black silty shales with conglomeratic intercalactions.

A second outcrop in Puerto Plata shows a less typical debris flow setting, with a varied sedimentological character.

Hermanas Mirabal
The section of La Toca Formation in Hermanas Mirabal Province displays a thick series of matrix supported conglomerates. The clasts of these massively bedded conglomerates are characterized by two main lithology types; tuff and limestone. The limestone clasts are dark grey and white, where the light colored limestones contain carbonate platform fauna including corals. The clasts are well-rounded and medium-sized. The succession increases upwards in bedding thickness where limestone clasts become more dominant, larger in size and more angular.

The sequence of conglomerates and provenance of the clasts point to sedimentation in a deltaic to shallow marine environment, where the clasts were transported by fluvial systems in the hinterland.

Paleontological significance 

La Toca Formation is one of the formations of the Dominican Republic where Dominican amber is found. The amber is known for the many types of insects and other arthropods it contains and even mammalian hair, a leptodactylid frog and a gilled mushroom have been discovered in the Dominican amber. Decades of study have led to an increased understanding of the invertebrate terrestrial fauna of the subtropical Early Miocene. Several genera have been described on the basis of these inclusions in resin from the fossil Hymenaea protera tree and the many fossils found in the amber provided a unique insight in the paleobiology of the Caribbean of the time. Of the 82 genera of spiders in Dominican amber, one third are extinct and about thirty percent are congeneric with extant taxa.

Fossil content 
The following fossils have been found in the formation:

See also 

 List of fossiliferous stratigraphic units in the Dominican Republic
 El Mamey Formation - Dominican amber formation of the Dominican Republic
 Yanigua Formation - Dominican amber formation of the Dominican Republic
 Thomonde Formation - Early Miocene formation of Haiti
 Lagunitas Formation - Burdigalian fossiliferous formation of Cuba
 Cucaracha Formation - Burdigalian to Langhian fossiliferous formation of Panama
 Castillo Formation - Burdigalian fossiliferous formation of Venezuela
 Honda Group - Langhian fossiliferous formation of Colombia

References

Bibliography 
General geology
 

Dominican amber

Maps

Further reading 
 

Geologic formations of the Dominican Republic
Neogene Dominican Republic
Burdigalian
Marl formations
Sandstone formations
Conglomerate formations
Turbidite deposits
Deltaic deposits
Shallow marine deposits
Paleontology in the Dominican Republic
Formations
Formations
Formations
Formations
Formations
Formations